The Iskander Darya is a river in Ayni District of Sughd Region, Tajikistan. It is the left source river of the Fan Darya.

The Iskander Darya has its source in Lake Iskanderkul and flows east. The mouth of Iskander Darya is near the village of Zarafshan II. The river merges with the Yaghnob at an altitude of around 1640 m, forming the Fan Darya.

References

Rivers of Tajikistan